National Quarantine Act of 1878 established quarantine regulations for foreign nautical vessels pursuing entrance into United States maritime ports. The United States statute declared it to be an unlawful pursuit for international vessels departing harbors termed as infected maritime ports to enter United States seaports and territorial waters. The Act of Congress authorized the prevention of communicable and transmissible diseases from entering or being introduced by any vehicle beyond the borders of the United States.

The Marine Hospital Service was commissioned for governing the defined regulations of the public law cooperatively formulating a national quarantine service. United States consular officers were certified to report vessels departing harmful foreign ports with an inclusion of providing Public Health Reports encompassing public health surveillance of potentially tainted foreign harbors, maritime ports, and their surrounding administrative divisions.

The United States public law was passed by the 45th congressional session and enacted into law by the 19th President of the United States Rutherford Hayes on April 29, 1878.

Clauses of the Act
The 1878 National Quarantine Act was drafted as six sections establishing regulations for contagious or infections diseases, transmissible maritime vessels, transitioning quarantine authority from the States to the federal government, and the development of a national quarantine system.

Contagious or infections diseases - 20 Stat. 37 § I
Vessels from infected ports entering the United States
Reports of Consular Officers - 20 Stat. 38 § II
Consulate to report vessels departing endangered ports
Public Health Reports by the consulate
Marine Hospital Service Surgeon General to fulfill provisions of the Act
Enforcement of Quarantine Laws - 20 Stat. 38 § III
Marine Hospital Service and customs officers provide enforcement of quarantine laws
Destination Notification of Maritime Port - 20 Stat. 38 § IV
Notifiable disease notification to be provided to threatened port of destination for a transmissible vessel
Port of destination to prepare and transmit to the medical officers of the Marine Hospital Service
State Quarantine System and National Quarantine System - 20 Stat. 38 § V
When officers of State quarantine system may act as officers of national quarantine system
When officers of Marine Hospital Service to act
Repeal of Inconsistent Acts - 20 Stat. 38 § VI
All Acts or parts of Acts inconsistent with National Quarantine Act are repealed.

See also

Infectious Diseases of 19th Century

References

External links
 
 

1878 in American law
45th United States Congress